Jonathan Taylor (born 12 October 1943 in London) is a British former alpine skier who competed in the 1964 Winter Olympics.

References

External links
 

1943 births
Living people
Sportspeople from London
British male alpine skiers
Olympic alpine skiers of Great Britain
Alpine skiers at the 1964 Winter Olympics